

Released Films 
The following is a list of films produced in the Kannada film industry in India in 1974, presented in alphabetical order.

Top Grossing Films

References

External links
 http://www.bharatmovies.com/kannada/info/moviepages.htm
 http://www.kannadastore.com/

See also

Kannada films of 1973
Kannada films of 1975

1974
Kannada
Films, Kannada